The following outline is provided as an overview of and topical guide to animal-powered transport:

Animal-powered transport – broad category of the human use of non-human working animals (also known as "beasts of burden") for the movement of people and goods. Humans may ride some of the larger of these animals directly on their backs, use them as pack animals for carrying goods, or harness them, singly or in teams, to pull (or haul) sleds or wheeled vehicles.

Animals domesticated for transport

Terrestrial
 camel, Arabian, and Bactrian
 carabao
 deer
 dog
 sled dog
 Dogcart (dog-drawn)
 elephant
 equine
 donkey
 mule
 hinny
 horse
 pack horse
 draught horse
 riding horse
 coach horse
 llama
 moose
 ostrich
 ox
 reindeer
 sheep
 yak

Amphibious
 Turtles were used for riding as a sport in early 20th-century Australia

Marine
 Dolphins (to carry markers to attach to detected mines)

Aerial
 Pigeon (for carrying messages)

Animal-powered vehicles

 barge (sometimes pulled by humans)
 berlin (vehicle)
 Brougham (carriage)
 caravan
 carriage
 cart
 chaise
 charabanc
 chariot (ancient form sometimes used in combat, later a racing machine, later a name for something entirely different in carriages)
 coach
 Conestoga wagon
 curricle
 dogcart
 dray
 ferry
 float
 gig
 governess cart
 Hansom cab
 horsecar
 horse-drawn boat
 horse-powered boat
 Experiment (horse-powered boat)
 howdah
 litter (vehicle) (sometimes carried by humans, mainly used with equines, though occasionally camels)
 mail coach
 Michigan logging wheels
 omnibus
 bullock cart
 pantechnicon van
 Park drag
 phaeton (carriage)
 postchaise
 pulka
 railway
 rockaway (carriage)
 sled
 sledge
 sleigh
 stagecoach
 streetcar
 sulky 
 tangah
 team boat
 telega
 towboat
 travois
 trolley
 van
 vardo
 Victoria (carriage)
 vis-a-vis (carriage)
 wagon
 wain

See also

 Experiment (horse-powered boat)
 Human-powered transport
 Muleteer
 Horse harness
 Howdah
 Iditarod Trail Sled Dog Race
 Zero-emissions vehicle
 Saddle
 Yoke

References

  Animal Traction Network for Eastern and Southern Africa

animal-powered transport
animal-powered transport